Cologira "Clara" Cannucciari (née Bonfanti; August 18, 1915 – November 29, 2013) was the host of the web series Great Depression Cooking with Clara and author of the book Clara's Kitchen.

Biography
Born in Melrose Park, Illinois, on August 18, 1915, Cannucciari went on to live through North America's Great Depression. During these difficult times, her recently-emigrated Sicilian American parents (Giuseppe and Giuseppina Bonfanti) were hit especially hard by North America's economic woes. Clara's mother found inventive ways to stretch the family's meals and they emerged from the Depression safe and healthy. Clara has recounted that she had to drop out of high school because her family couldn't afford socks.

In 2007, her grandson Christopher Cannucciari began filming Clara preparing her mother's Depression meals and assembled the footage into the YouTube series Great Depression Cooking with Clara. She retired shortly after her 96th birthday and her last video was posted on April 18, 2019 (Fried Fish). But activities on the channel had since been renewed as her grandson Christopher announced on March 25, 2020, that he'd be uploading more videos of his late grandma onto her YouTube channel.

Death
Cannucciari died November 29, 2013, aged 98. She is survived by her daughter-in-law, four grandchildren and three great-grandchildren.

References

External links
Great Depression Cooking with Clara's official website

Christopher Cannucciari's official website

1915 births
2013 deaths
American chefs
American people of Italian descent
American YouTubers
People from Melrose Park, Illinois
Writers from Illinois